Talat Yaqoob is a Scottish campaigner, writer and commentator focused on women's equality, race equality and intersectional analysis of policy.

Early life and education 
She was educated at Heriot-Watt University and earned her master's degree at the University of Edinburgh.

Career and activism 
She is an independent consultant and commentator. She launched Pass the Mic in October 2019, the first and only directory of women of colour experts in Scotland. She was the director of Equate Scotland from 2016 to 2020, working on women's equality across the science, technology, engineering and mathematics (STEM) sectors. During this time she conducted and published the first intersectional analysis of women's experiences in STEM in Scotland  She is co-founder and chair  of the cross-party campaign group Women 50:50. She is also a member of the First Minister’s Advisory Council on Women and Girls since 2017 and became co-chair of this council in 2022. She is a member of Gender Equal Media Scotland and the Royal Society of Edinburgh's Post-COVID-19 Futures Commission.

Awards and fellowships 
She was made a Fellow of the Royal Society of Edinburgh in 2020.

In 2017 she was awarded the Best Blog and Comment category of the Write to End Violence Against Women Awards for her blog 'Just Ignore it'.

She was awarded 2018 Outstanding Women of Scotland award from the Saltire Society.

A mural of her was sited in Edinburgh as part of a celebration of women in STEM in 2021

References 

Fellows of the Royal Society of Edinburgh
Women activists
Scottish women activists
Alumni of Heriot-Watt University
Alumni of the University of Edinburgh
Year of birth missing (living people)
Living people